San Pedro del Río Blanco Airport  is a rural airstrip on the western end of Laguna Portia, a lake in the Beni Department of Bolivia.

See also

Transport in Bolivia
List of airports in Bolivia

References

External links 
OpenStreetMap - San Pedro del Río Blanco
OurAirports - San Pedro Richard Airport
FallingRain - San Pedro del Río Blanco Airport
Mapcarta - San Pedro del Río Blanco

Airports in Beni Department